Brian or Bryan Ross may refer to:

Brian Ross (curler), Canadian curler
Brian Ross (footballer) (born 1967), Scottish football player and manager
Brian Ross (racing driver) (born 1962), American race car driver
Brian Ross (journalist) (born 1948), former American investigative correspondent for ABC News
Brian Ross (singer) (born 1954), British vocalist for heavy metal bands Blitzkrieg and Satan
CJ Mac (Bryan Ross, born 1969), American rapper and actor